The Russian Criminal Code is the prime source of the Law of the Russian Federation concerning criminal offences. The 1996 Criminal Code of the Russian Federation came into force on 1 January 1997. On 8 January 1997, President Yeltsin signed the Criminal Correctional Code to regulate the conditions of the sentences. The new Criminal Code replaced the Soviet analogue of 1960. The main changes deal with economic crimes and property crimes. These were the main pitfalls of the Soviet Criminal Code, as most of the other chapters were already amended to correspond to new Russian realities.

Modifications

2022
In March 2022, the Russia fake news law was added to the criminal code, as Article No. 207.3, titled "Public dissemination of knowingly false information about the use of the Armed Forces of the Russian Federation." The new law provides for a prison sentence of up to 15 years for knowingly disseminating false information about the Russian Armed Forces.

Washington Post interpreted the law to have the effect of criminalising the use of the term "invasion" to describe the 2022 Russian invasion of Ukraine, and forcing journalists and citizens using online social networks to use the official term "special military operation" to refer to the invasion.

See also
Civil Code of Russia
Offences Code of Russia

References

External links
 Full text of Criminal Code (in Russian)
 Full text of Criminal Code (in English) (1996)

Russia
Criminal code